Vannella is a genus of Amoebozoa.

It includes the following species:
 V. aberdonica Page 1980
 V. anglica Page 1980
 V. arabica Page 1980
 V. australis (Page 1983) Smirnov et al. 2007
 ?V. bengalensis Das, Mandal & Sarkar 1993
 V. bursella (Page 1974) Smirnov et al. 2007
 V. caledonica Page 1979
 V. calycinucleolus (Page 1974) Smirnov et al. 2007
 V. cirifera (Frenzel 1892) Page 1988
 V. croatica Smirnov et al. 2016
 V. contorta (Moran et al. 2007) Smirnov et al. 2007
 V. crassa Schaeffer 1926
 V. croatica Smirnov et al. 2016
 ?V. curtis Singh & Hanumaiah 1979
 V. danica Smirnov et al. 2007
 V. devonica Page 1979
 V. douvresi (Sawyer 1975) Smirnov et al. 2007
 V. ebro Smirnov 2001
 V. epipetala (Amaral-Zettler et al. 2006) Smirnov et al. 2007
 V. flabellata (Page 1974) Smirnov et al. 2007
 V. langae (Sawyer 1975) Smirnov et al. 2007
 V. lata Page 1988
 V. mainensis (Page 1971) Smirnov et al. 2007
 V. mira (Schaeffer 1926) Bovee 1965
 V. miroides Bovee 1965
 ?V. multimorpha Mote 1968
 V. murchelanoi (Sawyer 1975) Smirnov et al. 2007
 V. nucleolilateralis (Anderson, Nerad & Cole 2003) Smirnov et al. 2007
 V. oblongata (Moran et al. 2007) Smirnov et al. 2007
 V. pentlandii Maciver, Del Valle & Koutsogiannis 2017
 V. peregrinia Smirnov & Fenchel 1996
 V. persistens Smirnov & Brown 2000
 V. placida (Page 1968) Smirnov et al. 2007
 V. platypodia (Glaser 1912)
 V. planctonica Van Wichelen & Vanormelingen 2016
 V. plurinucleolus (Page 1974) Smirnov et al. 2007
 V. pseudovannellida (Hauger, Rogerson & Anderson 2001) Smirnov et al. 2007
 V. schaefferi (Singh & Hanumaiah 1979) Smirnov et al. 2007
 V. sensillis Bovee & Sawyer 1979
 V. septentrionalis Page 1980
 V. simplex (Wohlfarth-Bottermann 1960) Bovee 1965
 V. weinsteini (Sawyer 1975) Smirnov et al. 2007

References

Amoebozoa genera
Discosea